Christian is an English surname from the Latin "Christianus" meaning follower of Christ, from "christus" ("anointed"), created to translate the Hebrew messiah. As one of the native Manx surnames the name originates as an anglicisation of "Mac Christen"; Notable people with the surname include:

Ash Christian (1985–2020), American actor and film director
Autumn Christian, American writer
H. Basil Christian (1871–1950), South African-Rhodesian farmer and horticulturalist
Benny Gay Christian (1925–1982), American politician
Bill Christian (born 1938), American ice hockey player
Channon Christian, victim of Murders of Channon Christian and Christopher Newsom in 2007 in Tennessee, U.S.
Charlie Christian (1916–1942), American swing and jazz guitarist
Clara Marguerite Christian (1895–1964), first black woman to study at the University of Edinburgh
Claudia Christian (born 1965), American actress, a writer, a director singer and musician
Cody Christian (born 1995), American actor
Dave Christian (born 1959), American ice-hockey player
Ewan Christian (1814–1895), British architect
Fletcher Christian (1764–1793), leader of the mutineers on HMS Bounty and the founder of a colony on Pitcairn Island
Frank Christian (disambiguation), several people
Frederick Christian (disambiguation), several people
Garth Christian, English nature writer, editor, teacher and conservationist
Gerald Christian (born 1991), American football player
Geron Christian (born 1996), American football player
Glen Christian (born c. 1929), American football player
Hans Christian (disambiguation), multiple people
Henry B. Christian (1883–1953), American painter 
Hugh Cloberry Christian (1747–1798), Royal Navy rear-admiral
Ivan Christian (1919–1991), Pitcairn Island politician
James Christian, American musician
John Christian (disambiguation), multiple people
J. Orlean Christian (c. 1898–1979), American college sports coach
Lemuel McPherson Christian (1913–2000), Dominican composer
Linda Christian (1923–2011), Mexican film actress
Luci Christian (born 1973), American voice actress
Mary Christian (1924–2019), American educator and politician
Mary Sheila Christian (1924–1997), British emergency physician and surgeon
Neil Christian (1943–2010), British singer
Pearle Christian (born 1955), Dominican music educator, composer and cultural worker
Phyllis M. Christian (born 1956), Ghanaian lawyer and consultant
Robert Christian (1939–1983), American actor
Robert Francis Christian (1948–2019), American Roman Catholic bishop
Roy Christian, New Zealand rugby league footballer
Sharon Christian (1950–2015), Canadian artist
Shawn Christian (born 1965), American television and film actor
Stephen Christian (born 1980), American rock singer
Steve Christian (born 1951), Pitcairn Island politician
Terry Christian (born 1962), British television and radio presenter
Thomas Christian (1754–1828), Manx poet and translator
Tom Christian (1935–2013), Pitcairn Island radio operator
William Christian (disambiguation), several people

References

English-language surnames
Surnames from given names